Raymond John Giannelli (born February 5, 1966) is an American former professional baseball third baseman. He played in Major League Baseball (MLB) for the Toronto Blue Jays during the 1991 season and for the St. Louis Cardinals in 1995.

Giannelli attended Walter G. O'Connell Copiague High School and played college baseball at NYIT. He was drafted by the Blue Jays in the 38th round of the 1988 Major League Baseball draft. He was named a South Atlantic League All-Star in 1989 while playing for the Myrtle Beach Blue Jays. 

Giannelli was released twice by two different organizations during the 1996 season, the first two times he was released during his career.

His father played professional baseball for seven years in the Detroit Tigers farm system. Giannelli and his wife, Michelle, had a son, Matthew, in 1996.

References

External links

1966 births
Living people
American expatriate baseball players in Canada
American people of Italian descent
Baseball players from New York (state)
Colorado Springs Sky Sox players
Dunedin Blue Jays players
Knoxville Blue Jays players
Louisville Redbirds players
Major League Baseball third basemen
Medicine Hat Blue Jays players
Myrtle Beach Blue Jays players
NYIT Bears baseball players
Salt Lake Buzz players
St. Louis Cardinals players
Syracuse Chiefs players
Syracuse SkyChiefs players
Toronto Blue Jays players